Dorymyrmex lipan is a species of ant in the genus Dorymyrmex. Described by Snelling in 1995, the species is endemic to the United States and Mexico.

References

External links

Dorymyrmex
Hymenoptera of North America
Insects described in 1995